Malta competed at the 2016 Summer Olympics in Rio de Janeiro, Brazil, from 5 to 21 August 2016. This was the nation's sixteenth appearance at the Summer Olympics, since its debut in 1928, although it failed to register any athletes in five other editions (1932, 1952, 1956, 1964, and 1976).

Malta Olympic Committee selected a team of seven athletes, four men and three women, to compete in four different sports at the Games; all of them granted wild card entries without having qualified. The nation's roster in Rio de Janeiro was also a replication to those sent to Barcelona (1992), Atlanta (1996), and Sydney (2000), with an equal share of men and women. Among the sports represented by the athletes, Malta marked its Olympic debut in weightlifting.

The Maltese delegation featured three returning Olympians, including double trap shooter and medal prospect William Chetcuti, who set a record as the first Maltese to participate in four straight Games. Joining him were freestyle swimming sprinters Nicola Muscat and Andrew Chetcuti, who became the nation's flag bearer in the opening ceremony. Malta, however, has yet to win its first ever Olympic medal.

Athletics

Malta has received universality slots from IAAF to send two athletes (one male and one female) to the Olympics.

Track & road events

Shooting

Malta has received two invitations from the Tripartite Commission to send shooters competing in the men's double trap and women's pistol events, respectively, to the Olympics.

Swimming

Malta has received a Universality invitation from FINA to send two swimmers (one male and one female) to the Olympics.

Weightlifting
 
Malta has received an invitation from the Tripartite Commission to send Kyle Micallef in the men's light heavyweight category (85 kg) to the Olympics, signifying the nation's Olympic debut in the sport.

References

External links 
 

Olympics
2016
Nations at the 2016 Summer Olympics